Stella Akakpo (born 28 February 1994 in Villepinte) is a French athlete specialising in the sprinting events. She won the silver medal in the 4 × 100 metres relay at the 2014 European Championships. In addition, she represented her country at the 2013 World Championships.

Personal life
Akakpo was born in France and is of Togolese descent.

Competition record

Personal bests
Outdoor
100 metres – 11.17 (-0.4 m/s) (Angers 2017)
200 metres – 23.54 (+1.0 m/s) (Walnut 2013)
Indoor
60 metres – 7.12 (Metz 2016)
200 metres – 23.27 (Aubière 2016)

References

1994 births
Living people
People from Villepinte, Seine-Saint-Denis
Athletes from Paris
French female sprinters
French sportspeople of Togolese descent
World Athletics Championships athletes for France
Athletes (track and field) at the 2016 Summer Olympics
Olympic athletes of France
Sportspeople from Seine-Saint-Denis
Athletes (track and field) at the 2018 Mediterranean Games
Mediterranean Games competitors for France
Olympic female sprinters